An  is a Buddhist name for the number 10140, or alternatively for the number  as it is described in the Avatamsaka Sutra. The value of the number is different depending upon the translation. In these religious traditions, the word has the meaning of 'incalculable'.

Origin

Asaṃkhyeya is a Sanskrit word that appears often in the Buddhist texts. For example, Shakyamuni Buddha is said to have practiced for 4 great asaṃkhyeya kalpas before becoming a Buddha.

See also
History of large numbers

References

Buddhism and science
Large integers